Vathiyar is a 2006 Indian Tamil-language action comedy film directed by A. Venkatesh starring Arjun and Mallika Kapoor. The music was composed by D. Imman. It was released on 10 November 2006 and recorded an average at the box office.

Plot
Annadurai (Arjun) is a do-gooder don, but a police force led by ACP Easwara Pandian (Prakash Raj) and his sidekick (Sathyan) are after him. However, the poor need him as he is a Good Samaritan running an orphanage. He has help from his friends Subramani (Manivannan) and Ayyanar (Vadivelu). Dorai has a problem: his mother (Sujatha) does not approve of his ways and feels that he is just a loutish goon. There is also a TV journalist named Anjali (Mallika Kapoor), who is in love with Dorai because of his daredevil ways. Dorai has a past: he was just an honest-to-goodness schoolteacher who ends up as the deathly Dorai after a fire ravages a school and kills several children. The incident forces him to take on the system of venal officials and politics. Now, Dorai's biggest task is to nip a dark and dire politician who wants to bomb the city.

Cast

 Arjun Sarja as Annadurai alias Dorai, the protagonist
 Mallika Kapoor as Anjali, Dorai's love interest 
 Vadivelu as Ayyanar
 Prakash Raj as Eashwara Pandian
 Pradeep Rawat as MP Nachiyar, the main antagonist 
 Manivannan as Subramaniam, Dorai's friend
 Sathyan as Easwara Pandian's sidekick
 Amit Tiwari as Dorai Sister's lover
 Sujatha as Dorai's mother
 Devan as Factory Owner
 Thalaivasal Vijay as School Teacher 
 Manobala as Ayyanar's father
 Singamuthu as Ayyanar's father's friend
 Vennira Aadai Moorthy as Anjali's father
 Mahanadhi Shankar as Hooligan
 Sabitha Anand
 Thambi Ramaiah as Flower seller
 S. N. Lakshmi as Orphanage inmate
 King Kong
 Bonda Mani
T. K. S. Natarajan as himself (cameo appearance in the song "Ennadi Muniyamma")
 Shakeela as herself (cameo appearance in the song "Pombala Paappa")
 Antara Biswas in an item number
 Suja Varunee in an item number

Production
The film was officially launched at AVM Studios in 2006. Tulip Joshi was originally selected as the heroine but she was thrown out of the film as the crew couldn't control her starry tantrums and Mallika Kapoor was selected instead.  Singer Blaze was selected to make a cameo appearance.  The scene where Arjun defuses a bomb in Vinayaka Chathurthi was shot in Sri Perumbudur and cost twenty lakhs.  One assistant Director named Rajkumar had lodged a complaint with the Chennai Police Commissioner stating that his story has been stolen and made as Vathiyar.  However, Arjun has denied the accusations that he had walked off with Rajkumar's script. "I have no reasons to steal someone else’s work and call it mine. Vathiyar is my own creation", Arjun declared.

Release
The film was originally slated to release on Diwali, but due to financial strains, the movie was delayed for a month and finally released on 10 November 2006.

Reviews
Nowrunning wrote: "Except for the action sequences there is nothing much to write about the movie". The Hindu wrote: "The story is by Arjun and director A. Venkatesh has neatly woven the script to make it enjoyable for the masses". Indiaglitz wrote: "Vathiyar is Basha meets Gentleman meets countless vigilante justice movies. The story and treatment are on typical lines".

Soundtrack

Song composing and background score was done by D. Imman.

References

External links
Review of Vathiyar Movie, Indiaglitz
 

2006 films
Indian action films
2006 action films
2000s Tamil-language films
Films directed by A. Venkatesh (director)